Greensboro is a town in Gadsden County, Florida, United States. The population was 602 at the 2010 census.

Greensboro is part of the Tallahassee, Florida Metropolitan Statistical Area.

Geography

Greensboro is located in western Gadsden County at  (30.569333, –84.744560). It is bordered to the northeast by the city of Gretna. Florida State Road 12 passes through the town center, leading east  to Quincy, the county seat, and southwest  to Bristol.

Demographics

2020 census

As of the 2020 United States census, there were 461 people, 206 households, and 178 families residing in the town.

2000 census
As of the census of 2000, there were 619 people, 207 households, and 150 families residing in the town. The racial makeup of the town was 50.24% White, 32.47% African American, 1.13% Asian, 15.83% from other races, and 0.32% from two or more races. Hispanic or Latino of any race were 37.80% of the population.

There were 207 households, out of which 37.7% had children under the age of 18 living with them, 48.3% were married couples living together, 16.9% had a female householder with no husband present, and 27.1% were non-families. 21.3% of all households were made up of individuals, and 12.6% had someone living alone who was 65 years of age or older.  The average household size was 2.99 and the average family size was 3.41.

In the town, the population was spread out, with 31.0% under the age of 18, 12.8% from 18 to 24, 28.1% from 25 to 44, 17.8% from 45 to 64, and 10.3% who were 65 years of age or older.  The median age was 30 years. For every 100 females, there were 97.8 males.  For every 100 females age 18 and over, there were 97.7 males.

The median income for a household in the town was $31,458, and the median income for a family was $35,000. Males had a median income of $17,308 versus $17,708 for females. The per capita income for the town was $11,825.  About 15.3% of families and 24.3% of the population were below the poverty line, including 36.2% of those under age 18 and 9.9% of those age 65 or over.

Government and infrastructure
The U.S. Postal Service operates the Greensboro Post Office.

The Greensboro Volunteer Fire Department operates one fire station, located at the Earl Willis Community Center.

The Gadsden Connector, a bus route operated by Big Bend Transit, has a stop in Greensboro.

Education

Gadsden County School District operates two public schools in the community: Greensboro Elementary School and West Gadsden Middle School; the elementary facility was formerly Greensboro High School. Gadsden County High School (formerly East Gadsden High School) serves high school students.

In 2017 the former West Gadsden High School was renamed to West Gadsden Middle School as all high school students were moved to East Gadsden High School. At that time grades 4–5 moved from Greensboro Elementary to West Gadsden Middle.

The Earl Willis Community Center houses a library.

Gallery

References

External links
Town of Greensboro official website

Towns in Gadsden County, Florida
Tallahassee metropolitan area
Towns in Florida